The 2021 Balkan Athletics Championships was the 74rd edition of the annual track and field competition for athletes from the Balkans, organised by Balkan Athletics. It was held on 26 and 27 June at the Smederevo Fortress in Smederevo, Serbia.

Marija Vuković won the women's high jump with 1.97 metres – a Montenegro national record.

Results

Men

Women

Medal table

References

Results
74rd BALKAN SENIOR CHAMPIONSHIPS. Balkan Athletics. Retrieved 2021-06-30.

External links
Balkan Athletics website

2021
Balkan Athletics Championships
Balkan Athletics Championships
International athletics competitions hosted by Serbia
Smederevo